Harold Putnam  (19 November 1868 – 13 November 1945) was a Liberal party member of the House of Commons of Canada. He was born in Onslow, Nova Scotia, and became a lawyer.

The son of Robert Putnam and Elizabeth Hunter Sprott, he was educated at public school in Onslow, then high school in Truro, then at the Pictou Academy and Dalhousie University. He practised law in Truro. In 1900, he married Mary Laurence. From 1900 to 1921, Putnam was registrar of deeds for Colchester County. He was also appointed a King's Counsel.

He was elected to Parliament at the Colchester riding in the 1921 general election. After serving in the 14th Canadian Parliament, Putnam left the House of Commons and did not seek another term in the 1925 federal election.

References

External links
 

1868 births
1945 deaths
Lawyers in Nova Scotia
Liberal Party of Canada MPs
Members of the House of Commons of Canada from Nova Scotia
Canadian King's Counsel